Robert Grant Haliburton Q.C., D.C.L.  (3 June 1831 – 6 March 1901) was a Canadian lawyer and anthropologist. He became famous after founding the Canada First organization that saw English Canadian society as the "heirs of Aryan northmen" and that the French Canadians were a "bar to progress."

Early life 

Haliburton was born in Windsor, Nova Scotia. His father was Judge Haliburton who wrote the best selling Clockmaker series about the humorous adventures of the Sam Slick character. Like his father he graduated from University of King's College and was part of the local volunteer militia where he rose to the rank of Lieutenant-colonel. He was a lawyer, called to the bar in 1853.

Canada First and the Aryan North 

The Canada First movement was organized in Ottawa in 1868. It was at first supported by Goldwin Smith and Edward Blake. Ontario residents, George Denison, Charles Mair, William Alexander Foster and Robert Grant Haliburton founded the movement. Haliburton and like minded authors that made up the Canada First movement saw that the milder southern climate was said to lead to "degeneration, decay, and effeminacy." The harsher northern climate they argued was said to produce the most Canadian of characteristics, "the inclination to be moderate". The Canada First movement saw the French Canadian and Métis cultures as dead weight that was holding the advancement of English Canada back.

Later life 

Ill health required Haliburton to move to warmer climates and he spent his winters in Jamaica. After a lucrative career in law he was able to live off his investments and spent some time as an anthropologist and was instrumental in discovering the "dwarf races" of northern Africa and the Atlas region. A "rover", he died in Pass Christian, Mississippi, United States, on 6 March 1901; he was 69.

Works

 An Address On The Present Condition...British North America, (1857)
 Men Of The North And Their Place In History..., (1869)
 A Sketch Of The Life And Times Of Judge Haliburton, (1897)
 Voices From The Street
 
Source:

References

Further reading

 - Total pages: 316 
 - Total pages: 608 
 - Total pages: 236

External links

 
 
 

1831 births
1901 deaths
19th-century Canadian historians
Canadian humorists
Canadian King's Counsel
Writers from Nova Scotia
Canadian people of Scottish descent
People from Windsor, Nova Scotia
Persons of National Historic Significance (Canada)
People from Hants County, Nova Scotia
19th-century Canadian novelists
Historians of Atlantic Canada
Canadian male novelists
University of King's College alumni
19th-century Canadian male writers
Canadian male non-fiction writers